Bektash Khan, also known as Bektash Khan Gorji (died 1639), was a Safavid official and gholam who served as the governor (beglarbeg) of Baghdad between 1631 and 1638, during the reign of Shah (King) Safi (r. 1629–1642). His tenure was brought to an end in 1638 when the Ottomans captured the city during the ongoing Ottoman-Safavid War of 1623-39.

Biography
Bektash Khan was a member of the Mirimanidze clan, whose members had steadily risen through the Safavid ranks with the advent of the reign of Shah Abbas I (1588-1629), but had held influential positions priorly as well. After the death of his nephew Safiqoli Khan (Mirman Mirimanidze), Bektash Khan succeeded him to the governorship of Baghdad.

Bektash Khan made considerable repairs to the fortifications that were damaged in the previous sieges. He also built extensive outworks to prevent the enemy from approaching the walls. During the decisive Ottoman siege of 1638, Bektash Khan offered tough resistance, and it took them almost six weeks to take the city. Bektash Khan died a year after the fall of Baghdad; the modern historian Giorgio Rota notes that he died either by suicide, being murdered on order of Ottoman Sultan Murad IV, poisoned by his wife or of natural causes.

References

Sources
 
 
 
 
 

Bektash
1639 deaths
Iranian people of Georgian descent
Persian Armenians
Safavid governors of Baghdad
Ethnic Armenian Shia Muslims
Shia Muslims from Georgia (country)
Safavid generals
17th-century people of Safavid Iran
Safavid ghilman